Chaudhry Qamar Zaman is a retired Pakistani bureaucrat who served in BPS-22 grade as the Interior Secretary of Pakistan and ex-Chairman National Accountability Bureau (NAB).

Chairman NAB
NAB, the country’s top anti-graft watchdog, had almost become dysfunctional after the Supreme Court of Pakistan dismissed the then NAB chairman Fasih Bokhari through its 28 May 2013 judgment. Qamar Zaman has held several key positions in his career. Qamar Zaman was criticized in the local media after Supreme Court ordered an investigation of Qamar for his alleged involvement in a major corruption scandal. However, an internal inquiry carried out by his own agency did not lead to any formal charges against him in a court of law.

Positions held in the past
 Interior Secretary of Pakistan.
 Education Secretary of Pakistan.
 Commissioner Lahore and Executive Director Higher Education Commission
 Chairman of Capital Development Authority (CDA).
 Chief Secretary of Azad Jammu and Kashmir.

References

1950 births
Living people
Pakistan Army officers
Pakistani government officials
Pakistani civil servants
Chairmen of the National Accountability Bureau